Ady Spencer is a former professional rugby league footballer. He made history at University as the first player to win full Cambridge blues in both Rugby Union and Rugby League. He was regarded as the instrumental Cambridge player in the period of dominance over the Rugby League Dark Blues in the mid-1990s. He also played for Great Britain U19s in Rugby League before going up to Cambridge.

Background
Spencer was born in Warrington, Cheshire, England.

Career
Ady Spencer became the focus of national controversy when he was banned by the Rugby Football Union in 1994 for his appearance in the 1994 Rugby Union Varsity match having already played Rugby League at a professional level (albeit unpaid) with the London Crusaders. This was the subject of an Early Day Motion in the UK Parliament at Westminster 
.
Rugby Union was professionalised several months later after a high-profile campaign by MP's and media to highlight the case.

He made 58 appearances for the London Broncos in the Super League 1996–1999. He also played for the London Crusaders and the London Skolars.

From 2008 to 2010, he worked for the Rugby Football League in a Commercial role in London. He is now the Vice President of Business Development for Southern Chemical Corporation, based in Houston, Texas.

References

External links
Rugby League Project stats
Boys in Blue ensure Varsity match goes from strength to strength
MX9s - 2004 Middlesex Nines
(archived by web.archive.org) Oxford University Rugby League Club
Offiah released by Broncos
Rugby League: London delay final decision on Edwards
Far from Academic
The RFL

1973 births
Living people
English rugby league players
English rugby union players
London Broncos players
London Skolars players
Rugby league five-eighths
Rugby league players from Warrington
Rugby union players from Warrington